Amba Mariam (Amharic: ዐምባ ማሪያም) is a village in central Ethiopia. Formerly known as Magdala or Magdalena (መቅደላ Magdalenā or Mäqdäla) during the reign of Emperor Tewodros II (1855-1868).

Based on figures from the Central Statistical Agency in 2005, this town has an estimated total population of 1,899, of whom 988 were males and 911 were females. The 1994 census reported this town had a total population of 1,091, of whom 520 were males and 571 were females. It is one of three towns in Tenta woreda.

History 

By the early 19th century, Magdala was a mountain stronghold, or amba in the Wollo province of the Amhara people. When Johann Ludwig Krapf camped at its foot on 26 March 1842, it was one of the strongholds of Imam Liban of the Were Himano, a "House" or a sub-group of the Wollo Oromo.

Emperor Tewodros II conquered Magdala on 22 September 1855. He constructed a number of buildings on the top of the mountain, including a church and a palace. In 1862, he imprisoned several European missionaries. Again in January 1864, he imprisoned the British diplomat, Charles Duncan Cameron  inside the fortress over a perceived insult from Queen Victoria. A British military expedition led by Sir Robert Napier, landed at the Gulf of Zula on 4 December and set up a base camp at Zula before advancing on Magdala, which they reached in April 1868. Abandoned by the nobility and his followers, and after his remaining troops engaged the British forces at the Battle of Magdala, Tewodros withdrew into the fortress on Amba Mariam and killed himself with a pistol a few days later as the final assault began.

The British entered the capital, where they rescued the diplomats. Before departing from Abyssinia, Sir Robert allowed his troops to loot and burn Magdala, including its churches. The expedition looted a large number of treasures and religious items such as tabots. These are still held in various museums and libraries in Europe, as well as in private collections. A few items have been returned to Ethiopia, the most important being the crown of Tewodros II, which George V personally presented to the future Emperor Haile Selassie on his visit to England in 1925. Two tabots were returned in 2002 and 2003, from Scotland and England, respectively, prompting occasions of great rejoicing in the country.

 little remains of Tewodros's capital; the most visible item being Tewodros's cannon "Sebastopol".

The abandoned fortress was occupied briefly by Lij Iyasu after the defeat of his supporters in the Battle of Segale; troops of the victors subjected him and his followers to an unenthusiastic siege. On 18 July 1917, Iyasu slipped through the siege lines and rallied the peasantry of Wollo to revolt; the rebellion was crushed and many of Iyasu's generals were captured, forcing Lij Iyasu to flee to the Afar Depression.

See also 

 Acoma Pueblo

Notes 

Populated places in the Amhara Region
Ethiopia
Cities and towns in Ethiopia